The Mariinskyi Palace (Mariïnsjkyj palac) is the official  residence of the President of Ukraine. The Elizabethan baroque palace is sited on the right bank of the Dnipro River in Kyiv, Ukraine, adjoining the neo-classical building of the Verkhovna Rada, the parliament of Ukraine.

History

The palace was constructed by command of the Russian Empress Elizaveta Petrovna in 1744; her architect was Bartolomeo Rastrelli, the most eminent architect working in the Russian Empire at that time. One of the students of Rastrelli, Ivan Michurin, together with a group of other architects, completed the palace in 1752. Empress Elizabeth, however, did not live to see the palace completed; the first senior-ranking member of the Imperial Family to stay in the palace was Empress Elizabeth's niece-in-law, Empress Catherine II, who visited Kyiv in 1787. In the late 18th and early 19th centuries, the palace was the main residence of the Governors-General.

In the early 19th century, the palace burned down in a series of fires, and was in total disrepair and abandoned for almost half a century. In 1870, Emperor Alexander II had the palace reconstructed by the architect Konstantin Mayevsky, using old drawings and watercolours as a guide. It was then renamed after the reigning Empress Maria Alexandrovna. By her wish, a large park was established off the southern side of the palace. The palace was used as a residence for visiting members of the Imperial Family until 1917.

During the years of the Russian Civil War in 1917–1920, the palace was used as the Kyiv revkom headquarters, particularly during the Kyiv Bolshevik Uprising. In the 1920s, the building belonged to an agricultural school, soon after which it became a museum. The Mariinskyi was badly damaged during the Second World War, and was restored at the end of the 1940s. Another major restoration was completed in the early 1980s.

In popular culture 
The music video for the song "Naatu Naatu" from the 2022 Indian Telugu language film RRR was filmed at Mariinskyi Palace. The song won the 2022 Golden Globe Award for Best Original Song and the 95th Academy Award for Best Original Song.

Gallery

See also

 List of Baroque residences
 Klov Palace – Another Baroque palace in Kyiv

References

External links

 Mariinskyi Palace - Internet Encyclopedia of Ukraine
 Mariinskyi: an Elegant Palace in a Charming Park
 The Palace on Google Maps

Presidential residences
Bartolomeo Rastrelli buildings
Buildings and structures in Kyiv
Official residences in Ukraine
Baroque palaces in Ukraine
Royal residences in Ukraine
Houses completed in 1752
Houses completed in 1870
Government buildings in Ukraine
Pecherskyi District
Hrushevsky Street (Kyiv)